Gianluca Barilari  (born 14 February 1964) is a Swiss professional basketball coach. He was head coach of the Switzerland national team from 2017 to 2021. Before 2017, Barilari coached club teams in Italy, Turkey and Switzerland. He also coached several of Switzerland’s youth national basketball teams.

References

External links
 Eurobasket.com profile

Videos
 Thoughts on Defense by Gianluca Barilari - vimeo.com video 
 Championnat U16F: Interview with Gianluca Barilari (Training Responsible Swissbasketball) - Youtube.com video 

1964 births
Living people
Swiss basketball coaches
Sportspeople from Lugano